"Why" is a single by British DJ and singer, Sonique. Released on CD in Germany on 30 May 2005, the track peaked at number 90.

Track listing
"Why" (Radio Edit)
"Why" (Kean Sanders Remix)
"Why" (Tube and Berger Remix)
"Why" (Dinky Remix)
"Why" (Video)

Charts

References

2005 songs
2005 singles
Sonique (musician) songs
Bertelsmann Music Group singles